Oroshimachi Station may refer to one of the following railway stations in Japan:

 Oroshimachi Station (Fukushima) on the Abukuma Express Line
 Oroshimachi Station (Miyagi) on the Sendai Subway Tozai Line